Gianfranco Contri (born 27 April 1970) is an Italian former road cyclist. He won the silver medal in the team time trial at the 1992 Summer Olympics.

Major results

1987
 1st Coppa San Bernardino
1988
 1st  Team time trial, UCI Junior World Road Championships
1991
 1st  Team time trial, UCI Road World Championships
 1st  Team time trial, Mediterranean Games
1992
 1st  Time trial, National Amateur Road Championships
 1st Duo Normand (with Luca Colombo)
 2nd  Team time trial, Summer Olympics
1993
 1st  Team time trial, UCI Road World Championships
 1st  Team time trial, Mediterranean Games
1994
 1st  Team time trial, UCI Road World Championships
 1st Duo Normand (with Cristian Salvato)
 1st Coppa Città di Melzo
 3rd Overall Olympia's Tour
1996
 3rd Overall Olympia's Tour
1st Stage 7

References

1970 births
Living people
Italian male cyclists
Olympic silver medalists for Italy
Cyclists at the 1992 Summer Olympics
Medalists at the 1992 Summer Olympics
Olympic cyclists of Italy
Olympic medalists in cycling
Cyclists from Bologna
UCI Road World Champions (elite men)